Nils-Olav Skilbred (born 15 December 1949) is a Norwegian politician for the Progress Party.

He served as a deputy representative to the Norwegian Parliament from Telemark during the terms 1997–2001, 2001–2005 and 2005–2009.

On the local level, he is a member of Skien city council.

References

1949 births
Living people
Deputy members of the Storting
Progress Party (Norway) politicians
Politicians from Skien
Place of birth missing (living people)
21st-century Norwegian politicians